Palot (पालोट) is a village in Didwana  Tehsil in Nagaur district of Rajasthan, India. It belongs to Ajmer Division Division. It is located 85 km towards East from district headquarters Nagaur district. 15 km from Didwana. 171 km from the state capital Jaipur.

Palot Pin code is 341305 and postal head office is Koliya.

Koliya (7 km), Baldu ( 10 km), Mamroda (11 km), Singhana (11 km), Ratau are the nearby villages to Palot. Palot is surrounded by Ladnun Tehsil towards North, Jayal Tehsil towards west, Sujangarh Tehsil towards North, Makrana Tehsil towards South.

Ladnu, Sujangarh, Losal, Makrana are the nearby cities to Palot.

Gotras 
[*DHERU*](5)
Kalwaniya (70)
Bhambu (10)
Dara (90)
Rajput
Manda (8)
Swami
Bramahan (2)
Kumawat
Gandas
Bhami
Ragar
Jangir (1)

References

Villages in Nagaur district